Johan Gastien (born 25 January 1988) is a French professional footballer who plays as a midfielder for Ligue 1 club Clermont.

Career
Gastien started his career with his home-town club Chamois Niortais and made his debut in the 2–1 victory over Libourne-Saint-Seurin in Ligue 2 on 28 March 2008, coming on as a substitute for Ronan Biger. On 27 March 2010, he scored his first senior goal in Niort's 1–0 victory over Toulouse Fontaines, but was sent off later in the match. Gastien was part of the team that won promotion from the Championnat de France amateur in 2010 and subsequently promotion back to Ligue 2 two years later. In total, he played 140 league matches during six senior seasons with the club, scoring 14 goals.

On 25 May 2013, it was announced that Gastien had agreed a contract with Dijon for the 2013–14 season.

Personal life
He is the son of football manager and former player, Pascal Gastien. Johan has been coached by his father at Chamois Niortais and Clermont.

Career statistics

References

External links
 Johan Gastien at chamoisniortais.fr
 
 

1988 births
Living people
People from Niort
Sportspeople from Deux-Sèvres
French footballers
Footballers from Nouvelle-Aquitaine
Association football midfielders
Chamois Niortais F.C. players
Dijon FCO players
Stade Brestois 29 players
Clermont Foot players
Ligue 1 players
Ligue 2 players
Championnat National players
Championnat National 2 players
Championnat National 3 players